Giosuè Ritucci Lambertini di Santanastasia (1794, Naples–1869, Naples) was a military commander and minister of war in the Kingdom of the Two Sicilies.
He fought in the Napoleonic Wars.  He enlisted in the army in 1807, and was promoted to second lieutenant in 1811.

In 1848 he was injured in the leg during the revolt of Palermo.

In 1860 he led the kingdom's army at the Battle of Volturnus, and fought at the Siege of Gaeta.

Sources 
biography (Italian)

19th-century Neapolitan people
1794 births
1869 deaths
Kingdom of the Two Sicilies people